Atrik is a rural locality (a selo) in Urginsky Selsoviet, Khivsky District, Republic of Dagestan, Russia. The population was 339 as of 2010.

Geography 
Khursatil is the nearest rural locality.

References 

Rural localities in Khivsky District